Mount Bures is a small village in England on the Essex and Suffolk borders.  It takes its name from the mount or motte believed to have been built shortly after the invasion by William the Conqueror in 1066.

The Gainsborough railway line that runs through the village is believed to have been opened in 1848. A few miles down the line from Mount Bures is the Chappel Viaduct.  The Thatchers Arms in Mount Bures was thought to have become a brewhouse or public house to quench the thirst of the navvies working on the railway line and the viaduct in the late 1840s.

A bunker from the Colchester Stop Line, a series of bunkers built during World War II, can be found at Mount Bures.

Sergeants Orchard is a nature reserve managed by the Essex Wildlife Trust south of the village.

References

External links

 Mount Bures Website This gives a full history of the village from the Saxon times up to the present day.

Villages in Essex
Borough of Colchester